Ash-Shakur Stevenson (born June 28, 1997) is an American professional boxer. He is a former world champion in two weight classes, having held the WBO featherweight title from 2019 to 2020, the WBO super featherweight title from 2021 to 2022, and the WBC and The Ring super featherweight titles in 2022. As an amateur, he represented the United States at the 2016 Summer Olympics, winning a silver medal in the bantamweight division. As of June 2022, he is ranked as the world's best active super featherweight by the Transnational Boxing Rankings Board, BoxRec and ESPN.

Amateur career
Stevenson had a very successful career at the Youth Level, winning the 2014 AIBA Youth World Championships and 2014 Summer Youth Olympics. In 2015, aged 18, he won the Senior U.S. Olympic Trials, thus qualifying for the U.S. boxing team at the 2016 Summer Olympics in Rio de Janeiro, Brasil. In Rio, Stevenson won a silver medal, losing to Robeisy Ramírez of Cuba in the gold medal match. He was the highest-medaling male boxer for the United States – Claressa Shields won gold for the U.S. women's team.

World Series of Boxing record

Professional career

Featherweight

Early career 
Stevenson turned professional on February 9, 2017, signing a promotional contract with Top Rank. He signed Andre Ward as his manager.

Promoter Bob Arum told Ringtv that Stevenson would likely make his debut on a stacked card at the StubHub Center in Carson, California on April 22, 2017. Stevenson showed off his quickness, defense and punching skills as he won his first professional fight against American boxer Edgar Brito. Stevenson won via fifth round technical decision. Brito was cut on the left eye after an accidental headbutt in round 2. In round 3, he was deducted a point for intentionally headbutting Stevenson. From his own intentional headbutts, Brito suffered a cut over his right eye. The ringside physician stopped the bout. Stevenson was ahead on all three judges scorecards and won every round.

In an official press release on May 3, it was confirmed that Stevenson would make his Madison Square Garden debut on undercard of the Terence Crawford vs. Félix Díaz world light welterweight championship fight on May 20, 2017. His opponent was announced as Argentine boxer Carlos Suarez (6-3-2, 1 KO). Stevenson won the bout after 2 minutes and 35 seconds of the first round. Suarez was knocked down before the stoppage. Stevenson's third bout took place at the Pinnacle Bank Arena in Lincoln, Nebraska, again on the undercard of Terrence Crawford, this time his unification fight against Julius Indongo on August 19, 2017. Stevenson fought his second straight Argentine opponent, David Michel Paz (4-3) in a scheduled six-round fight. Stevenson easily outpointed Paz over 6 rounds winning 60–53 on all three scorecards. In round 5, Paz was knocked down following a straight left. Stevenson seemed comfortable and patient in letting the fight go the distance. On November 20, Top Rank confirmed 26-year-old Mexican Oscar Mendoza (4-2, 2 KOs) as Stevenson's opponent, which would take place on the undercard of Vasyl Lomachenko vs. Guillermo Rigondeaux on December 9, 2017, at the Madison Square Garden Theater in New York City, New York.

Stevenson's first fight for 2018 was announced on February 7 to take place at the Grand Sierra Resort and Casino's Grand Theater in Reno, Nevada on February 16 against Juan Tapia (8-1, 3 KOs) in a scheduled 8 round bout. Stevenson easily outpointed Tapia, winning 80–72 on all three judges' scorecards. Stevenson showed defensive improvements in the fight, boxed with his jab and worked to the body. He used the distance well, allowing Tapia to land only one punch at a time.

Stevenson vs. Gonzalez 
Stevenson continued his winning streak, compiling a perfect record of 12-0 before facing Joet Gonzalez for the vacant WBO featherweight title on October 26, 2019. Gonzalez was ranked #2 by the WBO at featherweight. The two men had a long-running feud, due to the fact that Stevenson's girlfriend of the past three years had been Gonzalez's younger sister, Jajaira. Gonzalez and his father openly disapproved of the relationship and of Stevenson. On the night, Stevenson outboxed his opponent, winning a unanimous decision with all three judges scoring the bout 119–109 in his favor. After the final bell, Stevenson attempted to reconcile with Gonzalez without success, saying, "I told him he's a helluva fighter. He didn't really want to talk to me, but it is what it is." On July 9, 2020, Stevenson vacated his WBO title without making a single title defense, as he had moved up to the super featherweight division.

Super featherweight

Stevenson vs. Clary 
On December 12, 2020, Stevenson fought Toka Khan Clary. Stevenson defeated Clary convincingly, winning the fight by a wide margin on the scorecards, with all three judges scoring the contest 100–90 in his favor.

Stevenson vs. Nakathila 
After improving to 15–0, Stevenson knocked Jeremiah Nakathila down with a check hook in the fourth round of their fight, en route to a shutout unanimous decision victory on June 12, 2021, in Las Vegas to win the vacant WBO interim junior lightweight title. Nakathila was ranked #2 by the WBO at super featherweight. The bout attracted criticism from pundits and analysts, citing the low number of punches thrown by either man leading to a lack of action. So few meaningful punches were thrown that the ESPN commentators Joe Tessitore, Tim Bradley and Andre Ward who were calling the fight criticized Stevenson during the live broadcast of the fight.

Stevenson vs. Herring 
On October 23, 2021, Stevenson faced WBO junior lightweight champion Jamel Herring at the State Farm Arena in Atlanta, Georgia. With a one-sided performance that saw Stevenson use remarkable hand speed, he became a two-division world champion when he defeated Herring via tenth-round technical knockout after being ahead on all three judges' scorecards. In the aftermath of his victory, Stevenson proclaimed, "I want to be a superstar in the sport; I'm here to last.".

Stevenson vs. Valdez 
On January 16, 2022, there were negotiations that Stevenson would have a unification bout with WBC champion Óscar Valdez. 3 days later, the fight was confirmed for April 30 at the MGM Grand Garden Arena, Paradise, Nevada. Stevenson dominated using his jab and footwork to outland and outwork Valdez, even scoring a knockdown in Round 6. Stevenson won by unanimous decision with scores of 117–110, 118–109 and 118–110. In doing so, Stevenson unified the WBC and vacant The Ring super featherweight titles with his WBO super featherweight belt. In the post fight interview, he said he had beat the Canelo team and opened up a potential fight with WBC lightweight champion Devin Haney. The fight drew in an average of 1,353,000 viewers on ESPN and peaked at 1,440,000.

Stevenson vs. Conceicão 
Stevenson's first championship defense as a unified super featherweight titlist was scheduled against the one-time WBC title challenger Robson Conceição. The fight headlined an ESPN broadcast card, which took place on September 23, 2022, at the Prudential Center in Newark, New Jersey. He entered the bout as a significant favorite, with most bookmakers having him at -1800 odds to win the fight. Stevenson missed weight by 1.6 lbs at the official weigh-ins leading to him being stripped of his WBC and WBO titles. In front of an audience of 10,107, Stevenson won the fight by unanimous decision, with two scorecards of 117–109 and one scorecard of 118–108. He was deducted a point in the ninth round for tossing Conceicão to the canvas. During the post fight interview, Stevenson announced his move to lightweight, citing his inability to make the junior lightweight limit. The fight drew a peak audience of 1,150,000 and averaged 1,097,000 viewers.

Lightweight

Stevenson vs. Yoshino
On November 9, 2022, the WBC ordered Isaac Cruz to face Stevenson in a lightweight title eliminator. As Cruz refused to enter into negotiations, the WBC ordered William Zepeda to face Stevenson instead, as the next highest ranked contender. Zepeda likewise passed on the fight, as did the former unified lightweight champion George Kambosos Jr. The order was finally accepted by Shuichiro Yoshino on January 11, 2023. Stevenson is scheduled to face Yoshino on April 8, 2023, at the Prudential Center in  Newark, New Jersey.

Personal life 
A native of Newark, New Jersey, Stevenson is the oldest of nine siblings, born to his mother Malikah Stevenson and raised by his stepfather Shahid Guyton. Stevenson's biological father, who was of Puerto Rican descent was not a part of Shakur's life. He took up boxing at age five under his grandfather Wali Moses and cites Andre Ward as his influence.

According to a police report, Stevenson and fellow boxer, David Grayton, were involved in an altercation in a South Beach parking garage. The two fighters made comments to a group of people in a parking garage. Stevenson was arrested on July 1, 2018, and charged with misdemeanor assault. On June 18, 2019, Stevenson agreed to a deal where the charges would be dropped after one year of probation and 50 hours of community service. He had already paid the victims' medical expenses.

Stevenson has a daughter born in 2021. He is engaged to Michelle Ragston, a rapper and singer who performs under the name "Young Lyric".

Professional boxing record

See also
List of Puerto Ricans
List of world featherweight boxing champions
List of world super-featherweight boxing champions

References

External links

Shakur Stevenson - Profile, News Archive & Current Rankings at Box.Live

 

|-

|-

|-

|-

|-

|-

1997 births
Living people
Boxers from Newark, New Jersey
American male boxers
Puerto Rican male boxers
African-American boxers
21st-century African-American sportspeople
Boxers at the 2014 Summer Youth Olympics
Youth Olympic gold medalists for the United States
Boxers at the 2016 Summer Olympics
Olympic boxers of the United States
Olympic silver medalists for the United States in boxing
Medalists at the 2016 Summer Olympics
Flyweight boxers
Bantamweight boxers
Featherweight boxers
Super-featherweight boxers
World featherweight boxing champions
World super-featherweight boxing champions
World Boxing Organization champions
World Boxing Council champions
The Ring (magazine) champions